is a railway station in the city of Ena, Gifu Prefecture, Japan, operated by Central Japan Railway Company (JR Tōkai).

Lines

Layout
The station has two opposed ground-level  side platforms connected by a footbridge. The station is attended

Platforms

Adjacent stations

|-
!colspan=5|JR Central

History
It elevated to a full passenger station on 1 April 1926. On 1 April 1987, it became part of JR Tōkai.

Passenger statistics
In fiscal 2016, the station was used by an average of 934 passengers daily (boarding passengers only).

Surrounding area
Takenami Elementary School

See also
 List of Railway Stations in Japan

References

External links

Railway stations in Japan opened in 1926
Railway stations in Gifu Prefecture
Stations of Central Japan Railway Company
Chūō Main Line
Ena, Gifu